Rudolf Schmidt was Nazi German Panzer General.

Rudolf Schmidt may also refer to:

Rudolf Schmidt (Major), Major in the Luftwaffe, Nazi Germany
Rudolf Schmidt (sculptor),  Austrian sculptor
 A nom de guerre of Nikolai Ivanovich Kuznetsov (1911–1944), Soviet intelligence agent and partisan

See also
 Rudolf Schmid (disambiguation)
 Rudolf Schmitt (1830–1898), German chemist